Hyalopatina rushii is a species of very small sea snail, a limpet, a marine gastropod mollusk in the family Phenacolepadidae.

Description

Distribution
This species occurs in the Gulf of Mexico, the Caribbean Sea and off the Lesser Antilles.

References

 Rosenberg, G., F. Moretzsohn, and E. F. García. 2009. Gastropoda (Mollusca) of the Gulf of Mexico, pp. 579–699 in Felder, D.L. and D.K. Camp (eds.), Gulf of Mexico–Origins, Waters, and Biota. Biodiversity. Texas A&M Press, College Station, Texas.

Phenacolepadidae
Gastropods described in 1889